Cape Shirley is the southernmost point on the island of Antigua in the nation of Antigua and Barbuda.

References 

Headlands of Antigua and Barbuda